Eriogenes is a moth genus of the family Depressariidae.

Species
 Eriogenes mesogypsa Meyrick, 1925
 Eriogenes cossoides (Butler, 1882)
 Eriogenes nielseni Edwards, 2003

Former species
 Eriogenes meyricki Duckworth, 1973

References

 
Stenomatinae